The white-fronted swift (Cypseloides storeri) is a species of swift in the family Apodidae. It is endemic to Mexico.

Its natural habitat is subtropical or tropical moist montane forests.

References

white-fronted swift
Endemic birds of Western Mexico
white-fronted swift
Taxonomy articles created by Polbot
Birds of the Sierra Madre del Sur